Glenwood, New Brunswick may refer to: 
Glenwood, Kings County
Glenwood, Northumberland County
Glenwood, Restigouche County